Austin Edmund Quigley (born December 31, 1942) was Dean of Columbia College of Columbia University, Lucy G. Moses Professor, and Brander Matthews Professor of Dramatic Literature at Columbia University,  in New York City, and the recipient of the 2008 Alexander Hamilton Medal, Columbia College's highest honor.  He is also a member of the Oscar Hammerstein II Center for Theatre Studies and of the Columbia University Doctoral Program Subcommittee on Theatre, has served on the editorial boards of Modern Drama, New Literary History, The Pinter Review, and the University of Michigan Press book series Theater: Theory/Text/Performance.

Personal history and education
Austin E. Quigley was born the second of five children, to school teachers Edmund and Marguerita Quigley, on December 31, 1942, in Northumberland, in Northern England, and later moved to the area of Newcastle.  He earned a B.A. in English literature at the University of Nottingham in 1967, a M.A. in Modern Linguistics at Birmingham University, in 1969, and, after moving to the United States in 1969, a Ph.D. in English and Comparative Literature and Literary Theory at the University of California, Santa Cruz, in 1971, where he was the recipient of a Danforth Fellowship.  In 1975, a revised version of his doctoral dissertation, "The Dynamics of Dialogue: A Study of the Plays of Harold Pinter", was published by Princeton University Press as his first book, The Pinter Problem.

Before he became an academic, Quigley's "first ambition was a career in professional soccer, and he played as a teenager for the junior team of one of England's premier clubs, Newcastle United," and also played "varsity soccer for Nottingham University and while a student there was selected to represent the county of Nottinghamshire."

He is married to Patricia D. Denison, a senior lecturer in English at Barnard College; they have four daughters, Laura Brugger, Rebecca Cooper, Caroline Adler, and Catherine Quigley, and live in New York City.

Academic career
Quigley's first teaching position was at the University of Massachusetts Amherst, in Amherst, Massachusetts, where he worked for two years before moving to the University of Virginia, where he chaired the English department before leaving to become H. Gordon Garbedian Professor of English and Comparative Literature at Columbia University in 1990. He also held visiting appointments at the University of Geneva, in Switzerland; the University of Konstanz, in Germany; and the University of Nottingham, in England.

In addition to helping to found the undergraduate major in Drama and Theatre at Columbia University and Barnard College, he also reconstructed and renewed "the Ph.D. and M.F.A. programs in theater."  He became associate director of the Columbia University Oscar Hammerstein II Center for Theatre Studies in 1992 and chairman of the Lionel Trilling Seminars in 1993.

At the end of the 2008–09 academic year, after a term of 14 years, Quigley plans to resign from his posts as Dean of Columbia College and Lucy G. Moses Professor; beginning in academic year 2009–10, he will "continue to teach at Columbia and conduct research as the Brander Matthews Professor of Dramatic Literature and also will serve as special adviser to the president [of Columbia University] for undergraduate education."

His scholarly and critical specialities explore "the nature and status of explanatory frameworks in literary studies, and his work has focused on the interface between literary and linguistic theory and modern philosophy of language," the plays of Harold Pinter, and related topics in modern drama and theatre.  When he became Dean of Columbia College in 1995, he had completed writing Theoretical Inquiry: Language, Linguistics, and Literary Studies, in which "he explores the capacity of theory to clarify the unexpected rather than confirm the presupposed," which was published by Yale University Press in 2004.

Selected bibliography
Articles and parts of books
"Creativity and Commitment in Trevor Griffith's Comedians".  Modern Drama 24 (1981):  404–23.
"The Dumb Waiter: Undermining the Tacit Dimension".  Modern Drama 21 (1978): 1–11.
"Pinter, Politics and Postmodernism (I)". 7–27 in The Cambridge Companion to Harold Pinter.  Ed. and introd. Peter Raby.  Cambridge, Eng., and New York: Cambridge UP, 2001.   (10).   (13).

Books
The Modern Stage and Other Worlds. New York: Methuen, 1985. 221–52.  (10).  (13).
The Pinter Problem.  Princeton: Princeton UP, 1975.  (10).   (13).
Theoretical Inquiry: Language, Linguistics, and Literature.  New Haven: Yale UP, 2004.  (10).   (13).

References

Sources
"Austin E. Quigley".  2008 Alexander Hamilton Medal honoree  biography.  Alumni News.  Columbia College of Columbia University.  Web.  7 Feb. 2009.
Merritt, Susan Hollis.  "The Making of The Pinter Problem" 157–64.  Chapter 7: "Some Other Language Games: Linguistic Parlays and Parleys".  137–70 in Pinter in Play: Critical Strategies and the Plays of Harold Pinter. 1990.  Durham, NC, and London: Duke UP, 1995.   (10).   (13).
Palladino, Lisa, and Ethan Rouen.  "Dean Austin Quigley Presented with Hamilton Medal".  Columbia College Today, Features.  Columbia University, January/February 2009.   Web. 6 Feb. 2009.

External links
Austin E. Quigley – Faculty Profile at Columbia University Department of English & Comparative Literature.
Austin E. Quigley – Faculty Profile in the Columbia University Doctoral Program Subcommittee on Theatre.

Living people
Columbia University faculty
Alumni of the University of Nottingham
1942 births
Alumni of the University of Birmingham